East Fork Rio Chama is a tributary of the Rio Chama in southern Colorado. The stream flows south from Dipping Lakes near the continental divide in Conejos County, Colorado to a confluence with the West Fork Rio Chama in Archuleta County, Colorado that forms the Rio Chama.

See also
 List of rivers of Colorado

References

Rivers of Colorado
Rivers of Archuleta County, Colorado
Tributaries of the Rio Grande
Rivers of Conejos County, Colorado